Rated R refers to movies (and also to TV shows and video games in certain systems) that have been given a "restricted" rating by one of the following film rating systems:
 Motion Picture Association of America film rating system
 Canadian Home Video Rating System

Rated R may also refer to:

Music
 Rated R (Queens of the Stone Age album), 2000
 Rated R (Rufa Mae Quinto album), 2002
 Rated R (Rihanna album), 2009
 "Rated R", a song by Ralph Tresvant
 "Rated R", a song by Redman
 "Reality Is Rated 'R'", a song by d.b.s. on the album If the Music's Loud Enough…
 "Rated R..." a song by The White Noise and Landon Tewers

People
 Rated R, a rapper under Universal Records
 "The Rated R", a rapper from Thug Life group
 "Rated-R Superstar", the nickname of Edge (wrestler)

Other uses
 Rated R, an entertainment program aired on the radio station DYAB in the Philippines

See also
 R rating (disambiguation)